Col de la Faucille is a high mountain pass in the department of Ain in the French Jura Mountains. It connects the town of Gex in Ain to the towns of Les Rousses and Saint-Claude in the department of Jura.

The Tour de France has traversed this category 2 climb 41 times, starting in 1911 and most recently in 2004.

The area has become popular as a ski resort known as Mijoux – Col de la Faucille.

See also
 List of highest paved roads in Europe
 List of mountain passes

External links 

Col de la Faucille on Google Maps (Tour de France classic climbs)

Mountain passes of Auvergne-Rhône-Alpes
Mountain passes of the Jura
Landforms of Ain